The 1960–61 Balkans Cup was the first edition of the Balkans Cup, a football competition for representative clubs from the Balkan states.

Yugoslavian runner-up Dinamo Zagreb chose to play in the first edition of the European Cup Winners' Cup, and no other Yugoslav team replaced them. The tournament was contested by 5 teams and Steagul Roșu Brașov won the trophy.

Standings

Matches

Notes
Note 1: After Steagul Roșu Brașov won the trophy on 15 November 1961, AEK Athens withdrew from the tournament.

References

External links

RSSSF Archive → Balkans Cup

Mehmet Çelik. "Balkan Cup". Turkish Soccer

1960
1960–61 in European football
1961–62 in European football
1960–61 in Romanian football
1961–62 in Romanian football
1960–61 in Greek football
1961–62 in Greek football
1960–61 in Bulgarian football
1961–62 in Bulgarian football
1960–61 in Turkish football
1961–62 in Turkish football
1960–61 in Yugoslav football
1961–62 in Yugoslav football
1960 in Albanian football
1961 in Albanian football